Estonia women's national floorball team is the national team of Estonia. They played their first international match on 10 February 2007.

History
The team participated in the Qualification to the B-Division for the 2007 Women's World Floorball Championship.  The qualifiers were held in Wolsztyn, Poland and Kapfenberg, Austria. The team did not advance out of qualifiers. The team participated in the Qualification to the B-Division for the 2009 Women's World Floorball Championship.  The qualifiers were held in Idrija, Slovenia. The team advanced and went on to finish fifth in the B-Division at the Västerås, Sweden hosted competition.

World Championships

References 

Women's national floorball teams
Floorball
Floorball in Estonia